Red TV may refer to:

 REDTV (Online TV channel)
 Red TV (British TV channel), a defunct channel
 Red TV (Colombian TV channel)
 Red TV (Peruvian TV channel)
 Red TV (Serbian TV channel)
 Red Televisión, a Chilean television channel, now named La Red
 Red (Taylor's Version), 2021 re-recording of Taylor Swift's album Red